The Mystery of Jaguar Reef is a radio drama, produced in 1996 by the ZBS Foundation. It is the tenth of the Jack Flanders adventure series. It combines elements of American culture and Old-time radio with themes of pirates and aliens.

Plot
Jack gets a call from his old friend Carmen (from Dreams of Rio) and is very concerned about her friend, Cassie, who it seems has become a "walk-in" while they were on holiday in Belize. She has left her body and a total stranger has moved-in. Sounds like the sort of problem only Jack Flanders can help with, except he seems to find the new Cassie very captivating.
Soon others are changing too - and it always seems to happen after they've hired the genial Captain Coco to take them diving around Jaguar Reef. Between a ship-load of cosmic Popeyes, a barrel of ancient and highly potent Viper Rum and some alien missionaries - Jack's got his work cut out.

Notes & Themes
This is much of the feel of The Incredible Adventures of Jack Flanders in this story - plenty of pirates - ancient and modern, flying ships and mix of cosmic and reality bending occurrences.

Captain Coco refers to Jack several times as 'Captain Jack'.

This is the only Jack Flanders story to involve aliens.

Quotes
Jack: "This is the next to the last straw. Hands me that can of cosmic spinach. I loves me spinach."

Credits
 Jack Flanders - Robert Lorick
 Carmen - Virginia Rambal
 Cassie - Ana Veronica Munoz
 Paulina - Gy Mirano
 Antonio -Jorge Pupo
 Captain Coco - Daryl Edwards
 Dr Weiss - Leslie Raymond
 Popeyes - Bill Raymond, Romley Hotchkiss, Larry Black, Bob Adrian
 Pirate Pete - John McDonough
 Hook & Wolfgang - Bob Adrian
 Juanita - Gy Mirano
 Narrator - Dave Herman
 Producer/Director - Tom Lopez
 Story - Meatball & Marushka Fulton
 Music - Tim Clark
 Script - M Fulton
 Engineer (BackPocket) - Joe Arlotta
 Asst. Engineer (BackPocket) - Joshua Chait
 Engineer (Froggy Acres) - T. Lopez
 Front Illustration - Greg Tucker
 Graphic Design - Jaye Oliver

Voices recorded at BackPocket Studios in New York City.
Production mixed at ZBS Froggy Acres.
Sound recorded in Belize.

"This project was supported in part by a grant from the National Endowment for the Arts. Additional support was provided by friends of ZBS Foundation. Special thanks to Robert Durand and John Romkey. Also, Captain Beefheart, wherever you are."

References

External links
 ZBS Foundation
 Whirlitzer of Wisdom fansite

American radio dramas
ZBS Foundation